Asociația Suporter Club Oțelul Galați (Galați Steel), commonly known as Oțelul Galați or simply as Oțelul, is a Romanian football club based in the city of Galați, Galați County, which competes in the Liga II.

Founded in 1964 as the team of the Galați steel works, Oțelul spent the first two decades of their existence in the lower leagues. It reached the Liga I for the first time in 1986, and has since amassed 27 seasons in the competition. Oțelul won the league title at the end of the 2010–11 campaign, becoming the first and only Romanian champion from the region of Moldavia to date; this triumph was followed by winning the 2011 Supercupa României. In the Cupa României, Oțelul's best result is reaching the final in 2004.

Internationally, the team's best performances are qualifying for the group stages of the 2011–12 UEFA Champions League and being one of the eleven co-winners of the 2007 UEFA Intertoto Cup. Oțelul's team colors are red, white and blue, and they play at the namesake Stadionul Oțelul.

History

Early years of football in Galați (1910–1964)

Football spread to Romania shortly before 1900, appearing in the cities of Arad and Bucharest. It arrived in Galați about 10 years later, through foreign trade companies and offices in the city, and the efforts of Officer Vladovici, a career soldier who had studied in France and brought football game regulations and equipment to Galați. The first games took place , when Vladovici's team from the 3rd Artillery Regiment played groups of English sailors stationed in the harbor. A year later, the Cavalry Regiment of Galați established a second team in the city. This led to the organization of several football matches, and the press highlighted the fact that matches were also possible with the sailors from British naval ships present in the Port of Galați. The students of Vasile Alecsandri High School (LVA) formed a team in 1919. A year later, emigrants from Turkey, Greece or Armenia set up (with support of the bourgeoisie) the teams of Olimpia and Niki, consisting largely of players coming from Italy, Greece and Turkey, where football was much more developed as a sport. A benchmark match took place on 7 May 1921, in an exhibition game ("sports propaganda"), when Triumf București defeated Internaționala Galați (a temporary team of foreign players established in Galați) 2–1. In the same year, the team of HMS Ladybird defeated Internaționala Galați 6–2. Though there were too few teams for organized competitions, inter-city matches intensified with Brăila, Tulcea, and Reni. There were also continuing matches with local teams Internaționala, Niki, Olimpia, Şoimii Dacia, Atlas and LVA, as well as military teams.

In 1922, Dacia Soimii and LVA merged to found Dacia Vasile Alecsandri Galați (DVA), a team that gained great popularity and for two decades was considered among the most powerful football clubs in the southern Moldavia and eastern Muntenia. Other new teams included Macabi, Aviaţia, Şcoala Comercială, Sportul, and Baza Navală.

The new teams and increasing popularity allowed different competitions to emerge, and championships took place at the town and district level. Club structures grew with teams of seniors, reserves, youths and children. The Greek bourgeoisie teams of Ermis, Acropolis, and Foresta were created.

In 1926, the first district championship took place. There were ten teams from Galați (including the neighborhood teams Şoimii and Gloria), two from Reni (Macabi and Dunărea) and one team representing Tulcea. The competition was a commercial success with DVA the first champions. In the next round DVA defeated Concordia Iași 6–1 and advanced to a final tournament for the national trophy. Ten teams took part, among them Chinezul Timișoara, Unirea Tricolor București, Colțea Brașov and AMEFA Arad. Lacking experience at this level of competition, DVA lost to Brasov 1–7.

Because at that time military teams were in fashion, Captain Slătineanu transferred from Braşov the team of Fulgerul. However, due to financial difficulties, Fulgerul had a short life. 1920s regulations did not allow the team to participate in the district championships. Instead, it took part in a series of international matches and competitions. This allowed the new Galați team to gain experience playing the powerful teams MTK Budapest, Vasas, Újpest, OFK Beograd, ŽAK Subotica and Rapid Wien. These matches were played with the ticket office closed.

In the late 1920s, economic hardships (affected by the economic crisis) led to the dissolution of most of the 20 clubs that had existed. At one time only three clubs took part in the district championship: DVA, Gloria, and Șoimii. In 1927, these latter two clubs, which had been founded as neighbourhood teams in Galați, merged as Gloria Şoimii. In 1932, at the initiative of the railroad workers, Gloria Şoimii and CFR Galați (the Galați railway football club) merged as Gloria CFR Galați.

Gloria CFR immediately joined the Lower Danube District Championship, alongside teams already experienced in official competitions such as: DVA, Ermis, Marina Danubiană and Unirea Tulcea. Gradually the team progressed and in the 1934–35 season became the champion of the Lower Danube District, then immediately promoted to Divizia C. A year later it was promoted to Divizia B. This promotion was possible after three promotion play-offs (in Bucharest, Galați, and Constanţa) against Telefon Club București, but also due to the Romanian Football Federation which recognized the value of the team. In the 1937–38 season, "the Railroad Workers" had a spectacular performance of 16 wins, a draw and a single defeat, and were promoted to Divizia A. In 1937, the club Metalosport Galați was formed in the city and had important results in the second and third leagues.

The championship schedule was interrupted by World War II and restarted in 1946. Galați was then represented by Gloria CFR in Divizia B, while Metalosport, Şantierul Naval and FC Arsenal were in the Divizia C. In the early 1950s, DVA was dissolved due to financial problems and Gloria CFR was relegated to Divizia C. The club Dinamo Galați (later renamed Siderurgistul Galați) was formed in 1955 and came very close to promotion to the country's premiere league in 1961 and 1962. Constructorul Galați was founded in 1950, and reached the Cupa României final in 1973. Siderurgistul was promoted in 1963 and in spite of oscillating results it was the best team of the town until the mid-1960s.

Oțelul, founding and ascension (1964–1985)
In 1964, following the reorganization of football in Galați, the club Oțelul was formed to represent the newly established Galați steel works. 
After three seasons in Divizia D, Oțelul was promoted to Divizia C at the end of the 1966–67 season and to Divizia B after another season. The 1968 promotion was in a close contest with Gloria Bârlad; both teams ended the season with 35 points, but Oțelul had a +23 goal differential to Gloria's +21. Oțelul's 1968 promotion squad included: Şerbănoiu, Berechet, Rusu, Florea–Boeru, Coman, Secăşeanu, Luban, Halmagy, Moşneagu, Cernega, Bruştiuc, Niculescu, Morohai, Leca, Ion Ionică, Ailoaiei, Obreja, Câmpeanu, Drăghiescu and Ogescu; with coaches Gh. Drăghiescu and Pompiliu Ionescu.

The rise of Oțelul led to the decline of Siderurgistul, which had been the city's primary team and had played the 1963 Cupa României final. In 1967, Siderurgistul gave up its place in the second league to Politehnica Galați and disappeared from Romanian football. After Oţelul completed two seasons in the second league, reaching 9th place in both 1968–69 and 1969–70, there was another reorganization of local football and Oţelul changed its name to FC Galați and later to FCM Galați, essentially forming a new club, known later mainly as Dunărea Galați. Between 1974 and 1980, this team achieved three seasons in Divizia A. Meanwhile, some of the players of the former Oțelul transferred to Divizia C club Dacia Galați, which in 1972 revived the name Oțelul.

Oțelul had not completely lost its identity after this maneuver and in the 1973–74 season returned to the second league, finishing 7th. However, the team finished the 1974–75 season in 17th place with only 24 points and was relegated to Divizia C, then disbanded. In 1976, the management of the steel industry decided to re-establish Oțelul, joining the county championship (Divizia D), and climbing to Divizia C and B. From 1976 to 1977 to 1980–81, their rankings were: 1st (Divizia D); 11th, 10th, 9th, and 1st (Divizia C). The 1980–81 squad of Oțelul included: Șerbănoiu, Călugăru, Cucu, Borș, Căstăian, Morohai, Ceacu, Ciurea, Pătrașcu, Pavel, Gheorghiu, Adamache, Ion Ionică, Basalîc, Ticu, Potorac, and Podeț; with coach Petru Moțoc.

The progress and growth of Oțelul was more difficult than that of traditional Romanian football clubs, due to the 1970 dissolution of the club in favor of Dunărea Galați, the 1972 reformation of Dacia Galați and the 1975 refounding. In 1980, immediately after the promotion of the team in the second league, a political decision of Galați County gave its place to Victoria Tecuci, some of the players reaching the team from Tecuci and the others signing with Divizia C side Metalosport Galați, owned by the Cristea Nicolae factory. However, in the summer of 1982, there was a turnabout when Metalosport was sacrificed for Oțelul, allowing Oțelul to reach for prominence after years of being held back.

Oțelul took advantage of this political trust and finished third in the 1982–83 season, eighth in 1983–84 and third in 1984–85 – after Petrolul Ploiești and local rival Dunărea Galați. Oțelul finished this last season with a 24–4–6 record, and 86 goals scored with 29 conceded, and were promoted to Divizia A. The squad that obtained that performance included: Călugăru, Ionel Dinu, Gh. Stamate, Oprea, Ciobanu, Popescu, Stoica, Radu, Ciurea, Burcea, Smadu, M. Stan, A.Stamate, Petrescu, Basalic, Rusu, Vaişcovici, Antohi, Bejenaru, Dumitru, Rotaru, Lala, Anghelinei, C. Stan, and Ralea; with coaches Costică Rădulescu and Ioan Sdrobiş.

Divizia A and UEFA Cup first seasons (1986–1999)

In its first year in the top stage of Romanian football, Oţelul finished at 11th place, climbing to 4th place the following season which qualified the club for the European Cup tournament in the 1988–89 UEFA Cup season. In the first match, before 30,000 supporters, Oțelul beat Italian side Juventus 1–0, the goal scored by Ion Profir from penalty. The team lost the second match to Gălățenii, 5–0. The squad that played against Juventus in the first European match of the club included: Călugăru – G. Popescu, Anghelinei, Agiu, Borali (Adrian Oprea) – Nae Burcea, Marius Stan, I. Profir, Oct. Popescu – Ralea (Drăgoi), Puiu Antohi. For Juventus: Stefano Tacconi, Nicolò Napoli, Alessandro Altobelli, Rui Barros and Michael Laudrup all played; with coaches Dino Zoff and Cornel Dinu.

At the end of the regular season, Oţelul was relegated. The club finished third in 1989–90 Divizia B and missed promotion against rival Progresul Brăila. In the 1990–91 season, Under the management of Marius Stan and Mihai Stoica, the club was promoted with an advance of 6 points in front of Gloria Buzău. "The Steelworkers" remained in the top division until 2015.

Following Oțelul's 1991 promotion, the club finished in the middle of the league: 8th in 1991–92 and 10th in 1992–93. The club participated in the 1991–92 Balkans Cup where it lost the final 0–1 on aggregate against Turkish side Sarıyer. Oțelul had a last-minute rescue from relegation in the 1993–94 season, which it finished one point above the relegation line. The team coach was replaced with Vasile Simionaș, former star of Politehnica Iași, and after two seasons finished at 13th place. At the end of the 1995–96 season, the club lost star players Radu Cașuba and Valentin Ştefan, but maintained a foundation moving forward with players such as: Iulian Arhire, Stelian Bordieanu, Gheorghe Bosânceanu, Gheorghe Cornea, Daniel Florea, Sorin Haraga, Gigi Ion, Viorel Ion, Costin Maleș, Dănuț Oprea, Tudorel Pelin, Emil Spirea, Adrian State, Viorel Tănase and Cătălin Tofan.

The 1996–97 season brought total football to Oțelul Stadium. Led by squad captain Valentin Ştefan, Oțelul finished the season at 4th place, with Viorel Ion in great form. The first signal arrived in the first round, against Steaua București, when "the Steelworkers" controversially lost after a foul committed against Daniel Florea in the penalty area, allowing a goal by Gigi Ion; another goal was scored by Viorel Tănase from 25 metres. A few rounds later, Oțelul beat then-leader Dinamo București 3–1. Later, a 4–3 win at Giulești Stadium against Rapid București became held as a historic victory for the club. Then was an unexpected 5–1 victory against FC U Craiova and Oțelul climbed to 2nd place in the rankings. With a 3–1 victory at FC Național (Romania's runners-up at the end of the season), Gălățenii were only 3 points behind the leader. Winning the final match 3–0 against Sportul Studențesc, Simionaș became Romanian coach of the year, Viorel Ion and Valentin Ştefan made their way to the national team and Oțelul finished 4th, matching their previous best finish.

Simionaș remained as coach at Galați for two more seasons and obtained another 4th place in 1997–98 and 6th in 1998–99. Highlights include 14 goals scored by Valentin Ștefan as a defensive midfielder at the end of the 1997–98 season, a 7–0 win against Jiul Petroșani with Maleș scoring Oțelul's 400th goal in the first league, and dramatic victories against Rapid București (1–0) and Progresul București (3–2).

After achieving 4th place in 1997, Oțelul competed for the UEFA Cup for the second time. They played in the first qualifying round against Slovenian side HIT Gorica and after a 0–2 defeat in Slovenia, Oțelul led 4–0 in the second match, but Gorica scored twice at 88 and 90 minutes, Protega and Enes Demirović qualifying Gorica dramatically. Oțelul also qualified for the 1998–99 UEFA Cup season where they passed the first round, after a 4–1 on aggregate against Macedonian side Sloga Jugomagnat. Oțelul stopped in the second round after a 0–6 loss on aggregate against Vejle Boldklub of Denmark.

In this period the club received nicknames such as: Cimitirul Granzilor or Campioana Provinciei ("The Provincial Champion"). The squad was also called Generația de Aur ("The Golden Generation"), a nickname that was later overshadowed by the 2010–11 team. However this generation could be considered one of the Oțelul's best three teams together with the 1988 and 2011 squads. Simionaș was fired in 1999 after a conflict with sporting manager Mihai Stoica.

Golden Age of Oțelul (1999–2012)
After Simionaș was fired, Dumitru Dumitriu became the new coach and Oțelul fell to 8th place at the end of the 1999–2000 season. Next season Oțelul dropped to 12th place, but then rose to 5th place, with Victor Roșca and then Marius Lăcătuș as coach.
 
This oscillation continued in 2002–03 when Oțelul finished at 13th place, and faced a relegation play-off against Bihor Oradea (called FC Oradea at that time). At Galați, "the Steelworkers" won 2–1, goals scored by Gheorghe Cornea and Mihai Guriță, but at Oradea, in front of 20,000 supporters and a motivated FC Oradea team – which had the chance to play in Divizia A again after a 12-year absence – Oțelul lost 1–3. Bogdan Vrăjitoarea scored a hat-trick for the hosts, while Viorel Tănase scored for Oțelul. It was a difficult defeat for the team. However, there was an unexpected turn of events: top division clubs Astra Ploiești and Petrolul Ploiești merged, leaving a vacant place in the league table for Oțelul.
 
The club was then bought by Nicolai Boghici, a businessman from Galați. Oțelul had a strong 2003–04 Divizia A season under coach Sorin Cârțu and finished at 5th place, while also making the club's first appearance in the Cupa României Final, where it lost 0–2 to Dinamo București. Immediately after this final, it was discovered that the association holding the club had debts of over 15 billion Romanian leu (ROL). Oțelul earned a position for the 2004–05 UEFA Cup competition, starting from the first qualifying round. Oțelul passed the first round after an 8–1 on aggregate against Dinamo Tirana, but stopped in the second round after a 0–1 on aggregate against Partizan.

In the 2004–05 Divizia A season Oțelul finished 8th. Marius Stan was appointed as the club's president starting in the 2005–06 season. In the first part of that season, Oţelul had failed to obtain more than 9 points and the team was rebuilt, coach Aurel Şunda replaced by Petre Grigoraş and 18 new players brought to the team. The changes turned the team's season around, beginning with a 3–0 victory against Dinamo, and Oțelul finished in 9th place. In the Romanian Cup, Oţelul was eliminated in the quarterfinals in penalty shoot-outs against FC Național.

In the 2006–07 season Oțelul finished 5th in the standings. At the end of this season, prominent player Viorel Tănase retired, scoring a goal in his last match. Thanks to good positioning in the league table, the team qualified for the UEFA Intertoto Cup. In the Romanian Cup, Oțelul was once again eliminated in penalties, this time by Steaua București.

The debut of the 2007–08 season was made in the UEFA Intertoto Cup, where Oțelul met Slavija Sarajevo (3rd place in the Premier League of Bosnia and Herzegovina). The match played in Bosnia and Herzegovina at Koševo Stadium ended 0–0. The second match played at Galați was an unexpected 3–0 win for Oțelul, with goals by Emil Jula (at 31 and 42 minutes) and Gabriel Paraschiv (70 min). In the finals, Oțelul faced well-known Turkish side Trabzonspor (4th place in the Süper Lig). Oţelul won the first match in Galați 2–1 in front of 5,000 spectators. Daniel Stan opened the score (28 min), Ersen Martin tied (83 min) and the match was decided by the goal of Gabriel Paraschiv (87 min). The second match was played at Hüseyin Avni Aker Stadium before more than 20,000 spectators. The Turkish side opened the score with a 15-metre-long shot in the corner by Ceyhun Eriş (8 min). János Székely scored five minutes later, then Gălățenii defended and counterattacked, Tadas Labukas and Emil Jula passing next to the second goal (77 min). After a counterattack, a Turkish defender made a penalty (88 min), and Emil Jula scored and qualified the team for the preliminary round of the UEFA Cup. In the UEFA Cup, Oțelul faced Lokomotiv Sofia (3rd place in the A PFG). The first match played on Balgarska Armia Stadium in Sofia was lost 1–3. In the second match Oțelul attacked but failed to score, and a 0–0 draw eliminated the team.

In the Liga I, Oţelul finished at 8th place. Emil Jula took 2nd place in the league's top scorers table, with 17 goals. For these feats head coach Petre Grigoraș was called cel mai tare din oraș ("the best of the city").

Problems arose in the 2008–09 season. Oțelul finished 12th and the club had reached a situation close to bankruptcy. The following season brought great changes as Petre Grigoraş left and was replaced by Dorinel Munteanu. In the 2009–10 season, Oțelul achieved 8th place.

Oțelul achieved its best performance in the 2010–11 season, winning the first league, defeating main rival FC Timişoara in a direct match for the title. Two months later, the club won the Supercupa României in a 1–0 victory over Steaua București. The squad which won included: goalkeepers Branko Grahovac, Cristian Brăneţ, and Gabriel Abraham; defenders Cornel Râpă, Samoel Cojoc, Cristian Sîrghi, Milan Perendija, Sergiu Costin, Enes Šipović, Constantin Mișelăricu, Adrian Salageanu, and Silviu Ilie; midfielders Ionuț Neagu, Gabriel Giurgiu, Ioan Filip, Ciprian Milea, Liviu Antal, Laurenţiu Iorga, Laurenţiu Petean, John Ibeh, Gabriel Viglianti, Răzvan Ochiroşii, Laurenţiu Buş, and Gabriel Paraschiv; and forwards Marius Pena, Bratislav Punoševac and Róbert Elek; with coach Dorinel Munteanu.

In the 2011–12 season Oțelul finished at 6th place, and also participated in the UEFA Champions League group stage for the first time. Their group had prominent opponents Manchester United, Benfica and FC Basel, and it was a huge moment for the club to play against top European teams. Oțelul did not obtain a single victory, losing at the limit: 2–3 and 0–1 against FC Basel, 1–2 and 0–1 against Benfica and a double 0–2 against Manchester United.

Decline and bankruptcy (2012–2016)

After two fantastic seasons Oțelul faced difficulty as the club's shareholders wanted the money the club had received for Champions League participation.

In the 2012–13 season Marius Stan left to become mayor of Galați, and Dan Adamescu became the new owner of the club. Oțelul lost Dorinel Munteanu as coach; Viorel Tănase, a star player who had retired in 2007, was named as his replacement. Tănase managed to finish the first part of the season outside the relegation zone, but during the winter break was replaced with Petre Grigoraş. Oțelul finished 11th with 43 points. In the Romanian Cup, they reached the semi-finals, where they were eliminated by Petrolul, the winner of the competition.

On 10 July 2013 Oțelul went into insolvency, despite 22 million earned from its participation in the UEFA Champions League the previous season, being one of the strangest cases in Romanian football.

Grigoraş left the club at the end of the 2013–14 season and Ionuţ Badea was hired for the new season. Poor results led to Badea's resignation and the arrival of Ewald Lienen, a German coach trained in the Bundesliga. He managed to finish the season with Oțelul at 10th place. Unfortunately, after this season the team broke up; Lienen and almost all of the players left due to poor financial situations. The 2014–15 season brought huge changes at Oțelul. Dan Adamescu was arrested in a case of bribery and the transfers were made in inadequate conditions. Among the coaches brought in and subsequently fired were: Michael Weiß, Tibor Selymes and Florin Marin. Additionally, the Liga I reorganized so that the last 6 places were relegated, instead of 4. Oțelul finished 17th and was relegated to Liga II, after 23 consecutive seasons in the top flight of the Romanian football. Oțelul had 27 seasons of Liga I, holding 16th place in the Liga I All-time table. It is also the second-best Moldovan team in this ranking, surpassed only by FCM Bacău – but it is the only Moldovan side to win a national title.

The next season spent in the Liga II was painful one for many of Oțelul's fans. The team had to fight in many of the games with the youth squad, ending last in the first series of the second league. The sporting relegation was followed by the club's bankruptcy, declared on 1 April 2016 by the Bucharest Tribunal. Less than 5 years after winning the first champion title, the club had suddenly disappeared.

The fall of Oțelul gave rise to many concerns in the Romanian media. In 2016, Marius Stan accused Adamescu for the devaluation of the club: 
In 2017, Adamescu's son, Alexander Adamescu, accused Stan of defective management and that the club was his piggybank:

Refounding and recent history (2016–present)
After the dissolution of the club, Oțelul supporters immediately founded a new association called Asociația Supporter Club Oțelul Galați and registered it to compete in Liga IV. On 19 July 2016, ASC Oțelul Galați was officially born with the objective of continuing the tradition of Oțelul and of football in Galați.

ASC Oțelul Galați was considered the spiritual successor of the old club because it wore the same colors, it played in the same stadium and was supported by the same fans. However, it didn't own the brand and league record of the old club, which had been bought at auction for 10,000. However, the winner of the auction did not pay the bid which became void. With the aid of a law firm, ASC Oțelul gained possession of the record and brand and became the official successor of the club on 12 September 2017.

At the end of its first season, ASC Oțelul won Liga IV – Galați County and defeated the champions of Iași County, Unirea Mircești, in a play-off to win promotion to the Liga III. Under coach Stelian Bordeianu, a former player of the club, Oțelul won 30 of its 32 matches in all competition, setting a record for Romanian football.

After 5 years in Liga III, ASC Oțelul finally gets a taste of promotion success in 2022. The return of legendary coach Dorinel Munteanu created just the right emulation in the club and fanbase and helped Oțelul take the next step in recovering its lost glory. The Galați boys didn't bat an eye with their superiority during the regular season, finishing 1st in Liga III Seria 2, with 15 wins and 1 draw out of 18 games. During the playoff Oțelul dominated the series, confirming their favorite status and topping the table, finishing 9 points clear of 2nd placed CSM Focsani. In the playoff semifinal, Oțelul was paired with Foresta Suceava. The first leg was played in Suceava, ending in a 1-0(Alin Nica '39) victory for Oțelul. With one goal in hand, the steelworkers didn't take anything for granted in the second game, getting the job done with a professional 2-0(Juri Cisotti '43, Paul Nistor '73) win in front of approximately 8,500 home fans. The first leg of the final, against CS Dante Botoșani started with an unjust 1-1(Francois Yabre '59) away in Botoșani. The match was dominated by Oțelul but the team lacked the right composure in front of goal. Dante used up all their luck in the first leg in Botosani and the second leg, played in Galați in front of a bumper crowd of 13,000 spectators on Stadionul Oțelul went according to plan. George Carjan('45+2), Alin Nica('50) and Denis Cires('73) scored in an undisputable 3-0 win for Otelul that propelled the steelworkers forward to Liga II.

Youth program
The youth academy of Oțelul Galați was never a big one and had an important local rival, Dunărea Galați football academy, from which many important footballers developed. Oțelul developed young players including: Iulian Arhire, Florin Cernat, Romulus Chihaia, Daniel Florea, Silviu Ilie, Laurențiu Iorga, George Miron, Ionuț Neagu, Dănuț Oprea, Cornel Râpă, Viorel Tănase, Cătălin Tofan, or Alexandru Tudorie.

Grounds

The club plays its home matches on Stadionul Oțelul in Galați. Over time, Oțelul also used other local venues such as Stadionul Nicolae Rainea, Stadionul Siderurgistul, and Baza Sportivă Zoltan David, but only for short periods of time or for a few matches.

Support

Oțelul has many supporters in Galați and Galați County, but also in the region of southern Moldavia. Oțelul Galați has many ultras groups such as: Steel Boys, Ultra Sud, Sidexplozia, SCOG and New Order. Regular fans that are not affiliated to any ultras groups can join the Liga Suporterilor Gălăţeni 1993 (The Galați Supporters League 1993) organization. After the 2016 dissolution of the club, Oțelul fans from the aforementioned groups founded Supporter Club Oțelul Galați and enrolled the team in the Liga IV; this action saved the club from a final disappearance, and their actions proved the attachment of the fans to "the red, white and blue" side.

Rivalries
The bitter rivals of Oțelul Galați are Dacia Unirea Brăila, who they face in a competition known as Derby-ul Dunării de Jos ("The Lower Danube Derby"). Any Galați–Brăila match is considered a derby, taking this term from a regional derby in the early years of football. Another important local rivalry is against Dunărea Galați, a club born from the breakup of Oțelul. Oţelul fans also share a rivalry with Poli Iaşi supporters, following a series of clashes between the two sets of fans. A much newer rivalry is one against FC Vaslui. At a national level Oțelul had important rivals over time, but most of them were conjuncture rivals such as: Steaua București, Dinamo București or Rapid București, especially in the 1990s, with later isolated episodes and Politehnica Timișoara between 2010 and 2011, when the two teams were fighting for the national title.

Honours

Domestic

Leagues
Liga I
Winners (1): 2010–11
Liga II
Winners (2): 1985–86, 1990–91
Liga III
Winners (4): 1967–68, 1980–81, 2020–21, 2021–22
Runners-up (1): 1972–73
Liga IV – Galați County
Winners (2): 1976–77, 2016–17

Cups
Cupa României
Runners-up (1): 2003–04
Supercupa României
Winners (1): 2011

European

UEFA Intertoto Cup
Winners (1): 2007

Players

First team squad

Out on loan

Club officials

Board of directors

 Last updated: 8 September 2022
 Source:

Current technical staff

 Last updated: 8 September 2022
 Source:

League history

Notable former players
The footballers enlisted below have had international cap(s) for their respective countries at junior and/or senior level and/or more than 100 caps for ASC Oțelul Galați.

Romania
  Mario Agiu
  Liviu Antal
  Iulian Apostol
  Eugen Baștină
  Gabriel Boștină
  Alexandru Bourceanu
  Vasile Brătianu
  Florin Cernat
  Romulus Chihaia
  Horațiu Cioloboc
  Sergiu Costin
  Gheorghe Dumitrașcu
  Daniel Florea
  Sorin Ghionea
  Gabriel Giurgiu
  Mihai Guriță
  Victoraș Iacob
  Silviu Ilie
  Gigi Ion
  Viorel Ion
  Laurențiu Iorga
  Silviu Iorgulescu

Algeria
  Jugurtha Hamroun

Argentina
  Gabriel Viglianti

Armenia
  Marian Zeciu

Bosnia and Herzegovina
  Branko Grahovac
  Enes Šipović

Bulgaria
  Stoyan Kolev
  Zhivko Zhelev

Burkina Faso
  Salif Nogo

Cyprus
  Athos Solomou

Lithuania
  Paulius Grybauskas
  Tadas Labukas

Moldova
  Valentin Lupașcu
  Artur Pătraș

Serbia
  Milan Perendija

Slovenia
  Jaka Štromajer

Uruguay
  Mauro Goicoechea

Romania
  Costin Maleș
  Cosmin Mărginean
  George Miron
  Ștefan Nanu
  Ionuț Neagu
  Răzvan Ochiroșii
  George Ogăraru
  Dănuț Oprea
  Gabriel Paraschiv
  Tudorel Pelin
  Marius Pena
  Cornel Râpă
  Adrian Sălăgeanu
  Cristian Sîrghi
  Marius Stan
  Valentin Ștefan
  Viorel Tănase
  Cătălin Tofan
  Adrian Toma
  Alexandru Tudorie
  Claudiu Vaișcovici

Notable former managers

 Gheorghe Constantin
 Petre Grigoraș
 Traian Ivănescu
 Ewald Lienen
 Ion Moldovan
 Dorinel Munteanu
 Angelo Niculescu
 Costică Rădulescu
 Vasile Simionaș
 Aurel Țicleanu

References

External links

 Official website
 

 
1964 establishments in Romania
Association football clubs established in 1964
Fan-owned football clubs
Football clubs in Galați County
Liga I clubs
Liga II clubs
Liga III clubs
Liga IV clubs
Sport in Galați